Dmytro Kasabutskyi (born 19 July 2000) is a Ukrainian football defender.

Career
Born in Kyiv, Kasabutskyi is a product of the Kyiv Oblast youth sportive schools.

Kasabutskyi played in the Ukrainian clubs of the different league levels, until September 2020, when he signed on loan contract with the Ukrainian Premier League FC Olimpik Donetsk. He not made his debut for Olimpik in the Ukrainian Premier League, but is currently playing in the Ukrainian Premier League Reserves.

References

External links
Profile at UAF Official Site (Ukr)

2000 births
Living people
Footballers from Kyiv
Ukrainian footballers
Association football defenders
FC Lyubomyr Stavyshche players
FC Avanhard Bziv players
FC Olimpik Donetsk players
FC Rubikon Kyiv players
Ukrainian Second League players